Red Rose Speedway is the second studio album by the British–American rock band Wings, although credited to "Paul McCartney and Wings". The album was released by Beatles-owned label Apple Records in April 1973, preceded by its lead single, the ballad "My Love". By including McCartney's name in the artist credit, the single and album broke with the tradition of Wings' previous records. The change was made in the belief that the public's unfamiliarity with the band had been responsible for the weak commercial performance of the group's 1971 debut album Wild Life.

Before recording the album, Wings recruited lead guitarist Henry McCullough and released their debut single, "Give Ireland Back to the Irish", which was banned by the BBC for its political message. Recording sessions for the album took place throughout 1972 at five recording studios in London. The group also recorded the non-album singles "Mary Had a Little Lamb", "Hi, Hi, Hi" and "Live and Let Die", the last of which was issued in June 1973. Originally planned as a double album, it was condensed into a single LP at the request of EMI. The company believed that the material was not of a sufficiently high standard and were mindful of the modest sales of Wild Life and Wings' first two singles. Members McCullough and Denny Laine later expressed disappointment in the choice of songs on the single album.

Red Rose Speedway peaked at number 5 on the UK Albums Chart and number 1 on the Billboard Top LPs & Tape chart in the US, while "My Love" topped the US Billboard Hot 100. Although a commercial success, the album was given a mixed response by music critics, with several reviewers considering the songs to be inconsequential and mediocre. Decades later, it continues to receive mixed reviews. The album was reissued in 1987 and 1993 with bonus tracks and remastered in 2018 as part of the Paul McCartney Archive Collection. The 2018 remaster includes the reconstructed double LP version of the album.

Background
In early 1972, McCartney decided to expand Wings to a five-piece band by adding another guitarist, Henry McCullough, and to begin touring with the group. The band briefly toured British universities in February. They played in small halls, often unannounced, to avoid the media scrutiny that came with performing at more established venues.

Despite not releasing an album in 1972, Wings issued three singles while preparing their follow-up to Wild Life: "Give Ireland Back to the Irish", which was banned by the BBC for its political sentiments; "Mary Had a Little Lamb", based on the nursery rhyme; and "Hi, Hi, Hi", which was banned by the BBC for drug references and sexually suggestive lyrics.

Recording
Recording for Red Rose Speedway began in March 1972. It was initially planned as a double album, and McCartney decided to include some unreleased songs that had originally been recorded during the Ram sessions in 1971, before the formation of Wings. Two of those songs, "Get on the Right Thing" and "Little Lamb Dragonfly", appeared on the final album. Sessions were held at Olympic Sound Studios in London, with Glyn Johns as producer. At the first session, McCartney asked Johns to think of him as "the bass player in the band" rather than as Paul McCartney, but then took offence when Johns duly treated him as an ordinary musician. Johns thought Wings were not a genuine band and not of the calibre of artist he usually worked with. Before long, according to author Howard Sounes, citing the producer's recollection, Johns was reading a newspaper in the control room at Olympic as the group smoked marijuana and jammed aimlessly in the studio. On 17 April, Johns told the press that he had quit working on the album due to a "disagreement" with McCartney and that "Now we have respect for each other."

Wings continued to record sporadically in between promoting their May 1972 single, "Mary Had a Little Lamb". After the band toured Europe in July and August, further recording sessions took place over October and November 1972 at Abbey Road Studios and Olympic. Morgan, Trident and Island were the other London studios where the band recorded that year.

The album was cut down to a single disc by McCartney – according to Henry McCullough, in an attempt to release a more commercial and less expensive record. The decision came about through EMI, however; in addition to believing that the material was not of a sufficiently high standard, the record company were mindful of the modest commercial performance of Wild Life and Wings' first two singles. The album ends with an 11-minute medley of the songs "Hold Me Tight", "Lazy Dynamite", "Hands of Love" and "Power Cut", which was made in a similar style to the Beatles' Abbey Road medley. "Power Cut" was written during the 1972 miners' strike. Laine later expressed his disappointment that only a single album was issued, saying that in its original form, Red Rose Speedway was "more of a showcase for the band". Among the omissions were his composition "I Would Only Smile", and "I Lie Around", on which Laine also sang the lead vocal. McCullough was similarly disappointed that several of McCartney's rock-oriented tracks were cut from the running order, which favoured the more lightweight material from the sessions.

"Live and Let Die", the title song to the James Bond film of the same name, was recorded during the sessions for Red Rose Speedway, but was initially released on the Live and Let Die soundtrack album. Laine included "I Would Only Smile" on his 1980 solo album Japanese Tears. "Mama's Little Girl" was recorded during the sessions and later turned up as the B-side of McCartney's "Put It There" single in 1990. Among the other discarded tracks were "Night Out", "Jazz Street", "Best Friend", "Thank You Darling", "The Mess" (which McCartney introduced on stage as "The Mess (I'm In)" during Wings' live shows) and a cover version of Thomas Wayne's song "Tragedy".

Artwork and packaging
The packaging for Red Rose Speedway included a 12-page LP-size booklet inside a gatefold sleeve. The booklet featured photos from Wings' live shows taken by Joe Stevens (credited as Captain Snap) and others by Linda. The artwork for the inside gatefold and part of the booklet was designed by Eduardo Paolozzi, while pop artist Allen Jones contributed drawings, a painting and a photo collage, all variously depicting women, throughout the booklet. The graphics were designed by Gordon House. EMI agreed to pay for the lavish packaging, which was originally intended for the planned double album.

Breaking with the approach taken on the band's previous releases, the artist credit included McCartney's name rather than Wings alone, and instead of a group picture, only his face appears on the front cover. The image shows McCartney in front of a motorbike engine, with a red rose in his mouth, and was taken by Linda. The motorbike was transported from the United States especially for the shoot, which took place at the photographic studio of the Sunday Times building in central London. The back cover featured the foot of a microphone stand and a bouquet of roses, with the image set inside a black background as if spotlit. In the space below this image was a Braille message to Stevie Wonder, reading "We love ya baby".

The name change to "Paul McCartney and Wings" was made in the belief that the public's unfamiliarity with the band had been responsible for the disappointing sales of Wild Life. In the US, Capitol Records were concerned that the positioning of the red rose on the front cover might make McCartney's face unrecognisable to record buyers. Since no artist credit was included with this image, the company issued the album with a blue sticker in the top right-hand corner, identifying the band and listing the songs.

Release
The album was preceded by the March 1973 release of its lead single, "My Love" backed with "The Mess". The latter song was recorded live during the band's summer 1972 European tour. With Apple Records giving precedence to two Beatles compilation albums – 1962–1966 and 1967–1970 – Red Rose Speedway was not issued until 30 April 1973, in the United States, with the UK release following on 4 May. "My Love" peaked at number 9 on the UK Singles Chart, and topped the US Billboard Hot 100 and Billboard Adult Contemporary charts. It raised expectations for the album, which peaked at number 5 in the UK and went to number 1 in the US.

The original compact disc version, released by EMI's Fame label on 5 October 1987, contained three bonus tracks: "I Lie Around", "Country Dreamer" and "The Mess (Live at The Hague)". An LP version of this CD edition was also released on the same day, omitting the bonus tracks. In 1993, Red Rose Speedway was remastered and reissued on CD as part of 'The Paul McCartney Collection' series, with "C Moon", "Hi, Hi, Hi", "The Mess (Live at The Hague)" (the B-side to "My Love") and "I Lie Around" (the B-side to "Live and Let Die") as bonus tracks. "Country Dreamer" was later added to the reissue Band on the Run from the same series.

In 2018, Red Rose Speedway was reissued as part of Paul McCartney Archive Collection. The bonus content included the reconstructed original double LP version of the album featuring different mixes of "Seaside Woman" and "I Would Only Smile" as to those released on Linda McCartney's Wide Prairie and Denny Laine's Japanese Tears respectively, the singles "Mary Had a Little Lamb", "Hi, Hi, Hi" and "Live and Let Die" with their respective b-sides, early and rough mixes of several songs as well as previously unreleased studio and live recordings, with the latter taken from the Wings Over Europe Tour. The songs "Country Dreamer" and "Little Woman Love" included on the reissue are the same versions that were previously released on the Band on the Run and Ram editions of the Paul McCartney Archive Collection.

Critical reception

Red Rose Speedway received a mixed response from contemporary music critics, many of whom dismissed its songs as mediocre. According to author and critic Bob Woffinden, writing in 1981, the album was an example of McCartney "continu[ing] to exasperate his audience" before he and Wings finally won respect with the late 1973 release of Band on the Run. John Pidgeon of Let It Rock found the side-two medley typical of McCartney's "lazy" attitude to songwriting and said: "Red Rose Speedway sounds as if it was written after a big tea in front of the fire with carpet-slippered feet up; listening to it takes about as much as going ten rounds with a marshmallow fairy." Pidgeon concluded by likening the album to The Emperor's New Clothes, ruing that McCartney appeared to have no one to challenge his judgment or "kick his arse". Village Voice critic Robert Christgau derided McCartney's reliance on "aimless whimsy" and described the work as "Quite possibly the worst album ever made by a rock and roller of the first rank". In a 1977 interview, McCartney said that it typically took him a few months to listen to an album as a whole after its release; in the case of Red Rose Speedway, he said he "couldn't stand" it. Joe Stevens, Wings' tour photographer in the early 1970s, recalled: "I thought Red Rose was a disaster and so did everyone connected with it. Except Paul."

According to author Michael Frontani, a generally favourable review in Rolling Stone, written by musician Lenny Kaye, signified a turnaround from a publication that had been openly hostile towards McCartney since 1970. Frontani adds: "While McCartney's music would continue to be criticized by some commentators as vacuous and facile, Kaye's review appears to mark the point where art of consequence was no longer required of McCartney by rock critics ..." Ian Dove of The New York Times noted that McCartney's work continued to pale beside that of his former bandmates John Lennon and George Harrison but deemed Red Rose Speedway his best album yet. Writing in the NME, Tony Tyler acknowledged that the album was "lightweight" and lacking in "intellectual posture" but added: "with all the current heaviness and after-me-the-apocalypse brainstuds around, I for one am bloody pleased to discover a lightweight record that not only fails to alienate, but actually succeeds in impressing via good melodic structure, excellent playing and fine production."

Like the NME, Rolling Stone soon changed its opinion of Red Rose Speedway. Writing in The Rolling Stone Record Guide (1979), John Swenson said that the album displayed "the worst aspects of McCartney as solo artist and band-leader" and was "rife with weak and sentimental drivel". In his 1977 book The Beatles Forever, Nicholas Schaffner described it as "pleasingly plump music – charming, harmless, entertaining fluff ... a perfect background to lazy afternoons in the sun".

AllMusic editor Stephen Thomas Erlewine considers Red Rose Speedway to be McCartney's "most disjointed album" and "deliberately slight ... in the way a snapshot album is important to a family yet glazes the eyes of any outside observer", but he adds: "Work your way into the inner circle, and McCartney's little flourishes are intoxicating – not just the melodies, but the facile production and offhand invention." Beatles biographer Robert Rodriguez views it as "a wildly uneven assortment of songs", of which the selections comprising the Abbey Road-style medley "aren't merely half-finished – they're half-assed". While describing Glyn Johns' disparaging comments about the finished album as "harsh", Howard Sounes writes: "but in a record review one couldn't award it more than three out of five stars."

Track listing
All songs written by Paul and Linda McCartney.

Side one

 "Big Barn Bed" – 3:48
 "My Love" – 4:07
 "Get on the Right Thing" – 4:17
 "One More Kiss" – 2:28
 "Little Lamb Dragonfly" – 6:20

Side two

 "Single Pigeon" – 1:52
 "When the Night" – 3:38
 "Loup (1st Indian on the Moon)" – 4:23
 "Medley" – 11:14
"Hold Me Tight" – 2:22
"Lazy Dynamite" – 2:50
"Hands of Love" – 2:14
"Power Cut" – 3:46

Archive Collection reissue
On 18 October 2018, it was officially announced that the album reissues of Wild Life and Red Rose Speedway would be released on 7 December 2018, as part of the Paul McCartney Archive Collection series. The Red Rose Speedway reissues were published in several editions:

Special Edition 2-CD; the original 9-track album on the first disc, including previously unreleased recordings and non-album singles on a second disc.
Deluxe Edition 3-CD/2-DVD/1-Blu-Ray; the original 9-track album on the first disc; originally proposed double album version on a second disc; previously unreleased recordings and non-album singles on a third disc; DVD including music videos, the "James Paul McCartney" TV show, "Live and Let Die" in Liverpool; DVD and blu-ray including "The Bruce McMouse Show," with 5.1 audio.
Remastered vinyl 2-LP; includes special edition tracks as well as a link to download materials.
Double album 2-LP; originally proposed version of the album, reconstructed from original acetates and master tapes, as well as a link to download materials.

Track listing
All songs written by Paul and Linda McCartney except "Seaside Woman" written by Linda McCartney, "I Would Only Smile" written by Denny Laine, and "Tragedy" written by Gerald H. Nelson and Fred B. Burch.

Disc 1 – The original 9-track album.

Disc 2 – Original double album version
"Night Out" – 2:16
"Get on the Right Thing" – 4:17
"Country Dreamer"  – 3:10
"Big Barn Bed" – 3:50
"My Love" – 4:08
"Single Pigeon" – 1:53
"When the Night" – 3:38
"Seaside Woman"  – 3:57
"I Lie Around"  – 5:01
"The Mess"  – 4:34
"Best Friend"  – 3:59
"Loup (1st Indian on the Moon)" – 4:23
"Medley" – 11:19
 "Hold Me Tight" – 2:22
 "Lazy Dynamite" – 2:50
 "Hands of Love" – 2:14
 "Power Cut" – 3:46
"Mama's Little Girl"  – 3:45
"I Would Only Smile" – 3:23
"One More Kiss" – 2:29
"Tragedy" – 3:21
"Little Lamb Dragonfly" – 6:23

Disc 3 – bonus tracks
"Mary Had a Little Lamb"  – 3:32
"Little Woman Love"  – 2:07
"Hi, Hi, Hi"  – 3:08
"C Moon"  – 4:34
"Live and Let Die" – 3:12
"Get on the Right Thing"  – 4:41
"Little Lamb Dragonfly"  – 6:08
"Little Woman Love"  – 2:08
"1882"  – 3:26
"Big Barn Bed"  – 3:48
"The Mess" – 4:53
"Thank You Darling" – 3:18
"Mary Had a Little Lamb"  – 5:22
"1882"  – 6:31
"1882" – 6:51
"Jazz Street" – 5:08
"Live and Let Die"  – 3:33

Disc 4 – DVD
"Music Videos"
"James Paul McCartney TV Special"
"Live and Let Die" 
"Newcastle Interview"

Disc 5 – DVD
"The Bruce McMouse Show"

Disc 6 – Blu-Ray
"The Bruce McMouse Show"

Special edition CD and LP bonus tracks
"Mary Had a Little Lamb" – 3:32
"Little Woman Love" – 2:07
"Hi, Hi, Hi" – 3:08
"C Moon" – 4:34
"The Mess"  – 4:34
"Live and Let Die" – 3:12
"I Lie Around" – 5:01
"Night Out" – 2:16
"Country Dreamer" – 3:10
"Seaside Woman" – 3:57
"Best Friend"  – 3:59
"Mama's Little Girl" – 3:45
"I Would Only Smile" – 3:23
"Tragedy" – 3:21
"Thank You Darling" – 3:18
"1882"  – 6:31
"Jazz Street" – 5:08
"Live and Let Die"  – 3:33
Tracks 8–14 are on the CD edition only.

Additional download track via paulmccartney.com
"Hands of Love"  – 2:22

Original double album track listing

Early acetate track listing
Originally planned as a double album, this is the track listing from drummer Denny Seiwell's acetates of the early incarnation of Red Rose Speedway dated 13 December 1972. Most tracks left off the released version ended up on B-sides, while others remained officially unreleased (such as "Tragedy", "Night Out", "Jazz Street", "1882") until the release of the 2018 Red Rose Speedway Deluxe remaster reissue.

Side one
 "Big Barn Bed"
 "My Love"
 "When the Night"
 "Single Pigeon"

Side two
 "Tragedy" (Gerald H. Nelson, Fred B. Burch)
 "Mama's Little Girl"
 "Loup (1st Indian on the Moon)"
 "I Would Only Smile" (Denny Laine)

Side three
 "Country Dreamer"
 "Night Out"
 "One More Kiss"
 "Jazz Street"

Side four
 "I Lie Around"
 "Little Lamb Dragonfly"
 "Get on the Right Thing"
 "1882" (live)
 "The Mess" (live)

 "I Would Only Smile" is a song featuring lead vocals from Denny Laine. It was eventually released on Laine's solo album Japanese Tears.
 "1882" is a song which dates back to 1970 when it was first recorded as a demo around the time of the McCartney album. A home studio version was recorded in January 1972. A live recording from the same concert as "The Mess" (at The Hague on 21 August 1972) had studio overdubs added but was not released until 2018.

Final double album track listing
According to McCartney's official website, his archive team found an updated double album track listing from 30 January 1973 that differed from Seiwell's 1972 acetates. McCartney confirmed the updated track list as the one originally intended for release, saying, "You know, this is actually how I recollect that double album."

In December 2018, McCartney officially released Red Rose Speedway: Reconstructed, a reconstructed version of its originally conceived "double album", as a bonus CD in the Deluxe configuration of Red Rose Speedway, and separately as 2 LP vinyl.

Side A
 "Night Out" – 2:16
 "Get on the Right Thing" – 4:17
 "Country Dreamer" – 3:10
 "Big Barn Bed" – 3:49
 "My Love" – 4:08

Side B
 "Single Pigeon" – 1:53
 "When the Night" – 3:38
 "Seaside Woman" (Linda McCartney) – 3:56
 "I Lie Around" – 5:01
 "The Mess (Live at The Hague)" – 4:40

Side C
 "Best Friend (Live in Antwerp)" – 4:05
 "Loup (1st Indian on the Moon)" – 4:24
"Medley" – 11:19
 "Hold Me Tight" – 2:22
 "Lazy Dynamite" – 2:50
 "Hands of Love" – 2:14
 "Power Cut" – 3:46

Side D
 "Mama's Little Girl" – 3:46
 "I Would Only Smile" (Denny Laine) – 3:46
 "One More Kiss" – 2:30
 "Tragedy" (Gerald H. Nelson, Fred B. Burch) – 3:22
 "Little Lamb Dragonfly" – 6:24

Total length: 77:12

 "Seaside Woman" features Linda McCartney on lead vocals. This was later released as a single under the pseudonym Suzy and the Red Stripes in 1977, as well as on Linda's posthumous compilation Wide Prairie. The title of this song is featured in the inner sleeve artwork of the LP release of Red Rose Speedway.

Other outtakes
Other songs recorded during this period that did not make the original single-disc release include:
 "Thank You Darling" – A duet featuring Paul and Linda McCartney. Released as a bonus track on the Red Rose Speedway 2018 Deluxe remaster reissue.
 "Soily" – A live recording was mixed down but did not make the short list of the album. McCartney made other attempts at recording this song in studio including a version recording in his home studio in January 1972, and in McCartney's "studio performance" film One Hand Clapping, which was eventually released as bonus track on the expanded remastered edition of Venus and Mars. This song was finally granted an official release when a version from McNichols Sports Arena in Denver appeared as a live recording on Wings' 1976 live album Wings over America.
 "Henry's Blues" – A song featuring lead vocals and slide guitar from Wings guitarist Henry McCullough. A live recording was made during Wings' European tour of mid-1972, although this has never officially been released.
 "Best Friend" – A live recording was mixed as well as a studio version. The studio version has not had an official release to date while a live recording in Antwerp was released on the reconstructed Red Rose Speedway 2018 double album.

Personnel

Wings 
Paul McCartney – vocals, bass, piano, guitars, electric piano, Mellotron, celeste, Moog synthesizer, ocarina
Linda McCartney – vocals, piano, organ, electric piano, electric harpsichord, percussion
Denny Laine – vocals, guitars, bass, harmonica
Henry McCullough – lead guitars, backing vocals, percussion
Denny Seiwell – drums, percussion

Additional personnel 
 Hugh McCracken – guitar on "Little Lamb Dragonfly"
 David Spinozza – guitar on "Get on the Right Thing"
 Alan Parsons – engineer
 Dixon Van Winkle – engineer on "Get on the Right Thing", "Little Lamb Dragonfly"

Charts

Weekly charts

Year-end charts

Certifications

Notes

References

Sources

External links

1973 albums
Apple Records albums
Paul McCartney and Wings albums
Albums produced by Paul McCartney
Albums recorded at Olympic Sound Studios
Albums recorded at Morgan Sound Studios
Albums recorded at Trident Studios